Hosmer's frog (Cophixalus hosmeri) is a species of frog in the family Microhylidae.
It is endemic to Australia.
Its natural habitats are subtropical or tropical moist lowland forests and subtropical or tropical moist montane forests.
It has previously been threatened by habitat loss but is now endangered.

The female has a snout–vent length of 17 mm.

References

Cophixalus
Amphibians of Queensland
Taxonomy articles created by Polbot
Amphibians described in 1985
Frogs of Australia